Buford Billy Champion (September 18, 1947 – January 7, 2017) was an American professional baseball right-handed pitcher, coach, and scout who played in 202 games in Major League Baseball (MLB) for the Philadelphia Phillies and Milwaukee Brewers, from –. 

Bill was selected by the Philadelphia Phillies in the 3rd round (58th overall) of the 1965 MLB June Amateur Draft out of Shelby High School in Shelby, NC.

He was traded along with Don Money and John Vukovich by the Phillies to the Brewers for Jim Lonborg, Ken Brett, Ken Sanders and Earl Stephenson on October 31, 1972.

Champion went on to become a scout for the Chicago Cubs and pitching coach for the Greenville Braves.

Champion died on January 7, 2017, in Shelby, North Carolina, at the age of 69.

References

External links

1947 births
2017 deaths
Major League Baseball pitchers
Baseball players from North Carolina
People from Shelby, North Carolina
Milwaukee Brewers players
Philadelphia Phillies players
Bakersfield Bears players
Huron Phillies players
Tidewater Tides players
Reading Phillies players
Eugene Emeralds players
Richmond Braves players
Oklahoma City 89ers players
Chicago Cubs scouts